Newstead is a residential locality in the local government area (LGA) of Launceston in the Launceston LGA region of Tasmania. The 2016 census recorded a population of 5366 for the state suburb of Newstead.
It is an inner suburb of the city of Launceston, located approximately 3 kilometres east of the central business district. Schools in the area include Newstead College, Scotch Oakburn junior school, Newstead Christian School and the Launceston Preparatory School.

History 
Newstead was gazetted as a locality in 1963.

The suburb took its name from "Newstead House", built in the vicinity in 1855 by Ronald Campbell Gunn. In 1919 it was renamed "Kawallah" but this was not supported by local residents and the area was unofficially known as Newstead until it became official in 1961.

Geography
The North Esk River forms most of the eastern boundary.

Road infrastructure 
Route A3 (Elphin Road / Hoblers Bridge Road) runs through from north-west to east.

References

External links
 Launceston city and suburbs

Suburbs of Launceston, Tasmania
Localities of City of Launceston